Benco Dental is an American dental product and equipment distributor based in Pittston, Pennsylvania.

History
Benco Dental has been privately owned and operated since 1930, when first-generation owner, Benjamin Cohen, moved to Northeast Pennsylvania after six years of traveling from train station to train station, selling dental supplies.

Benco Dental is now the largest privately owned full-service distributor of dental supplies, dental equipment, dental consulting & dental equipment services in the U.S. The company has remained family-owned and is in its third generation of leadership. During the company's 80-year history, Benco Dental has grown from a single storefront location in Wilkes-Barre, Pennsylvania, into the nation's fastest-growing dental distributor, with 50 regional showroom locations and 5 distribution centers servicing over 30,000 dental professionals in 48 states and Washington D.C.

In 2010, Benco Dental opened  a new  corporate headquarters, distribution center and equipment showroom in Pittston, Pennsylvania. The new facility, CenterPoint, houses the largest dental equipment showroom in North America, featuring 25 fully functional operatories, 13 operational digital imaging panoramic X-rays including 2D and 3D units, 3 sterilization centers, office design & lab concept suites and a summit training center that will host continuing education courses. Benco operates two other "Destination CenterPoints" in Costa Mesa, California, and Flower Mound, Texas. Additionally Benco Dental's footprint includes four distribution centers: Fort Wayne, Indiana, Jacksonville, Florida, Reno, Nevada, and Dallas, Texas, over 400 sales territory representatives and 300 service technicians.

In February 2018, the Federal Trade Commission accused Benco Dental, Patterson Companies, and Henry Schein, the three largest American full-service distributors of dental supplies, of violating antitrust law. In October 2019, an FTC administrative law judge dismissed the claims against Henry Schein while ruling that Benco and Patterson had violated antitrust laws by refusing to compete for the business of buying groups.

References

American companies established in 1930
Dental companies of the United States
Privately held companies based in Pennsylvania
1930 establishments in Pennsylvania
Health care companies based in Pennsylvania
Medical technology companies of the United States